Genocide is a fictional character appearing in American comic books published by DC Comics.  Genocide is a superweapon created by the Secret Society of Super Villains to fight Wonder Woman.  Her powers have yet to be revealed in full.

Publication history
Genocide first appeared in Wonder Woman vol. 3 #26 and was created by Gail Simone.

Fictional character biography
At some point in the future, Ares steals the dead body of Wonder Woman. He comes back through time and manipulates Dr. Barbara Minerva, the power behind the Secret Society of Super Villains, and Dr. T.O. Morrow to gather a team of scientists to collect soil samples from various regions of Earth where acts of genocide took place over the past 100 years ranging from 1908 to 2008. The scientists, with the magical help of Felix Faust, use the soil to further empower the corpse of Wonder Woman with the evil energy of death and destruction. The result is the creation of the sadistic monster Genocide, brought to life through a combination of science and magic. T.O. Morrow believed Genocide was too unstable to be let loose, and pleaded with Minerva to terminate the project. Further validating his point, Genocide even attacked her fellow team member Phobia, nearly killing her. Despite this, Morrow's words of caution were completely ignored.

Dr. Minerva initially set Genocide loose at a shopping mall in downtown Washington D.C. to draw the Justice League's attention. The Department of Metahuman Affairs dispatched a team of agents, which included Agent Diana Prince to investigate the disturbance. After Diana changed into her super powered alter ego, Genocide beat Wonder Woman nearly to the point of death and stole her Lasso of Truth. After having the lasso surgically grafted into her body by the new Crime Doctor, Genocide was sent to the home base of the Department of Metahuman Affairs to retrieve the captive Doctor Psycho. She slaughtered nearly everyone there before being attacked by the Justice League. Genocide quickly defeated Green Lantern, Firestorm, and Red Tornado. However, once Wonder Woman returned to the battle with reinforcements and the creature was close to being overwhelmed, Genocide tapped into a facet of Wonder Woman's lasso that allowed her to create an explosion of negative psychic energy. The blast destroyed the Department of Metahuman Affairs building and killed the majority of persons left in its wake. The resulting after-effect overwhelmed the few survivor's emotions and rationality, causing them to react negatively. Before leaving, Genocide kidnapped Wonder Woman's friend Etta Candy. Genocide tortured her, ultimately leaving Etta in a comatose state for Wonder Woman to later find.

Athena reveals to Diana the truth behind Genocide and that the creature will be used by Ares as an instrument to destroy the gods and heroes unless Diana can stop her. Upon learning this, Diana attacked Genocide with renewed vigor, ripping the surgically implanted lasso from Genocide's body and leaving her to drown in the ocean. When Diana went to retrieve the body, she discovered that Genocide had disappeared. Ares arranged for Poseidon's son Euphemus to bring him her body so that he can heal her wounds. He then transferred Genocide's soul into a clay figure of a demon child and placed it in the care of a rogue Amazon warrior named Alkyone who is determined to destroy Diana.

When Alkyone becomes the new Queen of Themyscira, she magically causes the spirit of Genocide to enter herself and three other Amazon allies by sacrificing the clay figure. Their present status is unknown as Wonder Woman slammed the Hecatonchires Cottus on top of them causing the stone monument they stood upon to crumble to the sea. The either unconscious or dead bodies of several of the Genocide-possessed Amazons were dragged to the shore by other non-possessed Amazons.

In 2016, DC Comics implemented another relaunch of its books called "DC Rebirth", which restored its continuity to a form much as it was prior to "The New 52". In this continuity, Genocide is a golem of unknown origin where she was defeated by Wonder Woman and the past and buried on the island of the Gargareans in the Tyrrhenian Sea. Sometime later, Paula von Gunther in her alias of Warmaster unearthed Genocide and used her blood to revive her. She then recruited Genocide to join her Four Horsewomen alongside Armageddon III and Devastation while planning to use Genocide as a weapon to use against the Amazons. While Warmaster battled Wonder Woman and managed to pierce the superheroine's shoulder with the Spear of Gudra, she threatened to have Genocide kill all the heroes guarding the portal to Themyscira unless Wonder Woman opened it and allowed her inside.

Soil sample locations

The known soil samples Genocide was created with were taken from:

 Auschwitz, Poland - Samples collected by Professor Ivo and Red Volcano.
 Logor Jasenovac, Croatia - Samples collected by Doctor Poison II.
 Darfur, Sudan - Samples collected by an as-yet-unknown member with black gloves, probably T.O. Morrow.
 Rwanda - Samples collected by an as-yet-unrevealed member.
 Cambodia - Samples collected by an as-yet-unrevealed member.

Powers and abilities
The full extent of Genocide's abilities has yet to be revealed. Genocide has superhuman strength, durability and speed. She also has the ability to teleport. Genocide can project anger, fear, and despair to weaken her enemies. Being a magical construct, she is nearly indestructible and can heal any damage her body receives. Because Genocide bears the body of the future Wonder Woman, she can tap into the Lasso of Truth to create a large explosion of negative psychic energy. The explosion can not only destroy nearby solid material and people, but also leaves survivors with a backlash of such negative emotion that they do not think or act rationally. She has effortlessly defeated the Justice League of America and nearly killed Wonder Woman herself.

See also
 List of Wonder Woman enemies

References

External links
 Genocide at DC Wiki
 Crisis Panel Report - Wonder Woman, Newsarama

Characters created by Gail Simone
Comics characters introduced in 2008
DC Comics characters who can move at superhuman speeds
DC Comics characters with accelerated healing
DC Comics characters with superhuman strength 
DC Comics characters who can teleport 
DC Comics female supervillains
Fictional golems
Mythology in DC Comics
Genocide in fiction
Wonder Woman characters